The Mall at Rockingham Park is the largest shopping mall in the state of New Hampshire, with  of floor space. The mall is adjacent to Interstate 93 and the former Rockingham Park race track in Salem, and was the state's third shopping mall to be built. The mall now hosts 144 stores, with Macy's, JCPenney, and Dick's Sporting Goods as anchors with two vacant anchors last occupied by Lord & Taylor and Sears. The mall is managed by Simon Property Group, which owns 28.2% of it. As of March 2015, the mall was Simon's highest grossing center, with annual sales of $2,105 per square foot.

Like the Pheasant Lane Mall in Nashua, the Mall at Rockingham Park is located close to the Massachusetts state line and draws many customers from that state. New Hampshire has no sales tax on most goods. The success of the Mall at Rockingham Park, which opened in August 1991, caused the Methuen Mall across the line in Methuen, Massachusetts, to close in 1997; it was replaced with The Loop, a "big box"-style center. The Mall at Rockingham Park also caused the adjacent (and older) Rockingham Mall to convert into a "big box" center, as Salem could no longer support two shopping malls. In 2006, the mall's original Macy's store (formerly Jordan Marsh) was closed with all Filene's converting into Macy's.

In 2012, Lord & Taylor renovated and converted the former Macy's space, opening its only New Hampshire store in March 2012. In 2015, Dick's Sporting Goods took over Sears' second floor as part of a deal with the company. It was one of 235 properties spun off from Sears Holdings into Seritage Growth Properties in 2015. Dick's opened October 2015.

On August 22, 2018, Sears announced it would close the store at the mall. A Cinemark Theatres complex opened in 2020 near the site of the old Sears Auto Center, which is separate from the rest of the mall.

On August 27, 2020, Lord & Taylor announced it would close two dozens stores following bankruptcy, including the one at Rockingham Park.

Design

Internal design
The center of the Mall at Rockingham Park is a circular walkway on both floors. In the center of this circle, there is a staircase to travel between floors. From this center, there are two major corridors at approximately a 140° angle. The longer corridor, which goes almost due north of the center, leads to Dick's Sporting Goods at the end, and the entrance to JCPenney partway along the corridor. The shorter corridor leads southeast, with Macy's at the end of this corridor. The central circle also connects to a food court.

Parking and surrounding roads
Route 38 surrounds most of the Mall at Rockingham Park. From Route 38, there are several entrances. Exit 1 northbound on Interstate 93 has a ramp that provides quick access to the mall; southbound, Exit 1 also provides access, but it is not as direct.

Between the mall and Route 38 to the east is a parking lot with two levels. The upper level provides access to all parts of the mall. A smaller parking lot on the southwest side of the mall leads to the southern half; there is another lot north of Dick's Sporting Goods and one east of Route 38 that was intended for the now-defunct racetrack.

References

External links 
 General information - Mall website

Salem, New Hampshire
Simon Property Group
Shopping malls in New Hampshire
Buildings and structures in Rockingham County, New Hampshire
Tourist attractions in Rockingham County, New Hampshire
Shopping malls established in 1991
1991 establishments in New Hampshire